Satanta can refer to:

 Satanta (Kiowa leader), a leader of the Kiowa people
 Satanta, Kansas, a town in the United States

See also
 Setanta (disambiguation)
 Santana (disambiguation)